Antimony sulfide may refer to either of two compounds of antimony and sulfur:

Antimony trisulfide, Sb2S3
Antimony pentasulfide, Sb2S5, known as antimony red